Martha Cowles Chase (November 30, 1927 – August 8, 2003), also known as Martha C. Epstein, was an American geneticist who in 1952, with Alfred Hershey, experimentally helped to confirm that DNA rather than protein is the genetic material of life.

Early life and college education

Chase was born in 1927 in Cleveland, Ohio. Her father was a Western Reserve University Science Instructor and she grew up with her family in Cleveland Heights, Ohio. After graduating from Cleveland Heights High School, she received a bachelor's degree from the College of Wooster in 1950, then worked as a research assistant before returning to school in 1959 and receiving a PhD in Microbiology from the University of Southern California in 1964.

Research and later life

In 1950, Chase began working as a research assistant at Cold Spring Harbor Laboratory in the laboratory of bacteriologist and geneticist Alfred Hershey. In 1952, she and Hershey performed the Hershey–Chase experiment, which helped to confirm that genetic information is held and transmitted by DNA, not by protein. The experiment involved radioactively labeling either protein or nucleic acid of the bacteriophage T2 (a virus that infects bacteria) and seeing which component entered Escherichia coli upon infection. They found that nucleic acids but not protein were transferred, helping resolve controversy over the composition of hereditary information. Hershey won the Nobel Prize in Physiology or Medicine for the discovery in 1969, but Chase was not included.

Chase left Cold Spring Harbor Laboratory in 1953 and worked with Gus Doermann at Oak Ridge National Laboratory in Tennessee, and later at the University of Rochester. Throughout the 1950s, she returned yearly to Cold Spring Harbor to take part in meetings of the Phage Group of biologists. In 1959, she began doctoral studies at University of Southern California in the laboratory of Giuseppe Bertani. Bertani moved to Sweden and Chase finished her thesis with Margaret Lieb in 1964.

While in California, Chase met and married fellow scientist Richard Epstein in the late 1950s and changed her name to Martha C. Epstein. The marriage was brief and they divorced shortly after with no children. A series of personal setbacks through the 1960s ended her career in science. She moved back to Ohio to live with family and spent the last decades of her life suffering from a form of dementia that robbed her of short-term memory. She died of pneumonia on August 8, 2003, at the age of 75.

Namesakes
The family Chaseviridae, a group of bacteriophages in order Caudovirales, was named in honor of Martha Chase.

Key paper
Hershey, A. D. and Martha Chase. "Independent Functions of Viral Protein and Nucleic Acid in Growth of Bacteriophage." J. Gen. Physiol., 36 (1): 39-56, September 20, 1952, at Oregon State University website

References

External links
 Gallery Martha Epstein Chase, Cold Spring Harbor Laboratory
 Gallery 18: Alfred Hershey and Martha Chase, 1953, Cold Spring Harbor Laboratory
 Thesis paper: “Reactivation of Phage P2 Damaged by Ultraviolet Light,” 1964

1927 births
2003 deaths
People from Shaker Heights, Ohio
People from Cleveland Heights, Ohio
American women biochemists
American geneticists
American women geneticists
20th-century American women scientists
20th-century American chemists
College of Wooster alumni
University of Southern California alumni
21st-century American women
People with dementia
Deaths from pneumonia in Ohio